Won't You Cry? is a 2022 Iranian drama film directed and written by Alireza Motamedi. Led by Motamedi, the film features an ensemble cast including Baran Kosari, Fereshteh Hosseini, Hanieh Tavassoli, Mani Haghighi, Ali Mosaffa, Linda Kiani, Nahal Dashti and Amir Hossein Fathi. The film had its world premiere at the 43rd São Paulo International Film Festival and had its premiere in Iran at 41st Fajr International Film Festival.

Summary
Ali, a sport’s writer, can’t cry over his brother’s death. Haunted by its memory through his daily life, he quits his job and ends up being the focus of interest of his family and friends who worry about him.

Cast 

 Alireza Motamedi as Ali
 Baran Kosari
 Fereshteh Hosseini
 Hanieh Tavassoli
 Mani Haghighi
 Ali Mosaffa
 Linda Kiani
 Nahal Dashti
 Amirhossein Fathi

References

External links
 
 

2022 films
2020s Persian-language films
Films directed by Alireza Motamedi
Iranian drama films